Stani, stani Ibar vodo, is a famous Serbian song written by Dragiša Nedović. The Ibar river referred to in the song runs from Kosovo to Kraljevo where it joins the Zapadna Morava. It also divides the city of Kosovska Mitrovica in North Kosovo. It is one of the most known songs in former Yugoslavia; for example, Goran Bregović's song War uses its first stanza.

External links
https://web.archive.org/web/20131203011124/http://medioteka.net/milan-babic/stani-ibar-vodo

References

Serbian patriotic songs